Babar Yaqoob Fateh Muhammad is a retired Pakistani civil servant who serves as chairman of the Federal Land Commission of Pakistan (with status of a Federal Minister), in office since April 2020. Previously, he served in BPS-22 grade as the Cabinet Secretary of Pakistan, Chief Secretary Balochistan and Maritime Secretary (in acting capacity).  He also served as ECP Secretary and Chief Secretary Gilgit Baltistan. He belongs to the Pakistan Administrative Service and is batchmates with Shehzad Arbab, Tariq Bajwa and Sajjad Saleem Hotiana.

Career
Babar Yaqoob currently serves as chairman of the Federal Land Commission of Pakistan and enjoys the status of a Federal Minister. Previously, he served as Cabinet Secretary of Pakistan under Prime Minister Nawaz Sharif and as Chief Secretary Balochistan from 2012 to 2014. He also held the office of Maritime Secretary of Pakistan in an acting capacity. Earlier, he served as and Chief Secretary Gilgit Baltistan. He also remained as District Coordination Officer Kasur. 

During the 2018 general elections, he served as the ECP Secretary. Babar is known for his upright and solid reputation.

See also
 Government of Pakistan
 Pakistan Administrative Service

External links

Year of birth missing (living people)
Living people
Pakistani civil servants
Government of Pakistan
Pakistani government officials